Josh Bruce (born 28 June 1991), professionally known as Bru-C, is a British MC and rapper from Long Eaton, Derbyshire, England, but now based in Nottingham. 

Bru-C's debut album Original Sounds, was released on 22 November 2019 with CruCast, which was his record label at the time. His second album Smile, was released the following year on 4 December. On 16 December 2021, Bru-C signed a contract to join the major record label, Def Jam Recordings.

Discography

Albums

Extended plays

Singles

References

1991 births
Living people
People from Long Eaton
English record producers
English male rappers
Masters of ceremonies